Iguarima is a genus of South American anyphaenid sac spiders first described by Antônio Brescovit in 1997. it contains only two species.

References

Anyphaenidae
Araneomorphae genera
Spiders of South America
Taxa named by Antônio Brescovit